The Ferengi are a fictional extraterrestrial species in the American science fiction franchise Star Trek. They were devised in 1987 for the series Star Trek: The Next Generation, played a prominent role in the following series Star Trek: Deep Space Nine, and have made brief appearances in subsequent series such as Star Trek: Voyager, Star Trek: Enterprise, Star Trek: Discovery, Star Trek: Lower Decks, and Star Trek: Picard.

When launching Star Trek: The Next Generation in 1987, Gene Roddenberry and the show's writers decided to introduce a new alien species to serve as antagonists for the crew of the USS Enterprise-D. The Ferengi first appeared in "The Last Outpost", the show's fourth episode, which was set in the year 2364. The writers decided that the Ferengi ultimately failed to appear sufficiently menacing, instead replacing them with the Romulans and Borg as primary antagonists. Throughout the rest of the series, Ferengi characters were primarily used for comedic effect.

When creating Star Trek: Deep Space Nine, the show's writers decided to introduce the Ferengi bartender Quark (Armin Shimerman) as a major character, and subsequently his brother Rom (Max Grodénchik) and nephew Nog (Aron Eisenberg) as recurring characters, again frequently using them for comedic purposes.

Ferengi culture, especially as portrayed on Deep Space Nine, is depicted as hyper-capitalistic, focused on the acquisition of profit as the highest goal. Deep Space Nine writers have described how they saw the Ferengi as a satirical presentation of 20th century humans.

Name

The name Ferengi was coined based on the Persian term Ferenghi, used throughout Asia (compare older Feringhee), meaning "foreigners" or "Europeans".

History

Star Trek: The Next Generation

While preparing scripts for the first season of Star Trek: The Next Generation, the idea of the Ferengi was devised by Gene Roddenberry and Herbert Wright. The new alien species initially appeared in the first season's fourth episode, "The Last Outpost", which was based on a story by Richard Krzemien and a teleplay by Wright. In this story, the USS Enterprise-D—whose crew are the main protagonists of the series—makes first contact with the Ferengi while pursuing one of their vessels, which has stolen a T-9 energy converter. Both ships are immobilized over an unknown planet, leading both to send away parties to investigate, where they encounter each other. One of the actors who played a Ferengi in "The Last Outpost", Armin Shimerman, would go on to play a Ferengi again in the later episode "Peak Performance" before being cast as the Ferengi bartender Quark in Star Trek: Deep Space Nine.

The Ferengi outfits designed for "The Last Outpost" featured fur wrap-arounds. As weapons, they were given blue whips that fired energy bolts when cracked; these were subsequently dropped from the series and not used in later depictions of the species.
Mike Okuda designed the Ferengi insignia to present the idea of "dog eat dog". It was colored green because of that color's associations with greed, envy, and money. The Ferengi ship featured in the episode was designed by Andy Probert, who used a horseshoe crab on Wright's desk as inspiration, with the model then being constructed by Greg Jein.

The Ferengi were reused for the season's ninth episode, "The Battle", based on a story by Larry Forrester that Wright converted into a teleplay. This episode was first aired in November 1987. In it, a Ferengi called DaiMon Bok gives the Enterprise Captain Jean-Luc Picard (Patrick Stewart) the derelict ship that the latter once captained, the Stargazer. Over the course of the episode, it is revealed that this is part of Bok's plan for vengeance, for he holds Picard responsible for the death of his son many years before. Forrester's first plot outline had featured various scenes aboard the Ferengi spaceship, but these did not make it into the episode. Series writer Rick Berman later noted that because of their "silliness quotient", the Ferengi became "a disappointment as a major adversary".

For the second-season episode "Peak Performance", written by David Kemper and directed by Robert Scheerer, the USS-Enterprise-D is depicted encountering a hostile Ferengi ship while engaging in a practice exercise. The Ferengi uniform was revised for this episode, and new collar pips were added to designate their differing ranks. The season three episode "The Price", which was written by Hannah Louise Shearer, directed by Robert Scheerer, and first aired in November 1989, also included Ferengi characters. In it, two Ferengi delegates compete against their Federation counterparts to gain access to a newly discovered stable wormhole; later in the episode, it is revealed that the wormhole was not really stable and the Ferengi get stuck on the other side of it, in a distant part of the galaxy. "The Price" is the first episode in which a Ferengi starship was referred to as a "marauder".

Star Trek: Deep Space Nine

When the writers were putting together the premise of Star Trek: Deep Space Nine, they decided to introduce a recurring Ferengi character who would inhabit the space station Deep Space Nine that was the main setting for the show. The show's co-creator, Michael Piller, later noted that: "It was clear to me that having a Ferengi aboard Deep Space 9 would provide the show with instant humor and built-in conflict with the Federation guy in charge of the station". The show's creators developed the character of Quark, a Ferengi bartender who would, according to Piller, be "a constant thorn in the side of law and order, but who has a sense of humor about it. He'd be someone who could obviously throw lots of story dynamics into play." Piller and the others consciously wanted to play the Quark character off against the station constable, Odo (René Auberjonois); according to Piller, "the idea of Odo and Quark being at loggerheads was there from day one".

Through the character of Quark and his family, Deep Space Nine developed the culture and politics of the Ferengi in some detail. Episodes of the series portray the Ferengi's hyper-capitalistic emphasis on profit and sexist social norms (at the beginning of the series, Ferengi females are not permitted to earn profit or even wear clothing), and the society's gradual evolution away from those norms as, for example, Quark's mother becomes a respected businesswoman and Quark comes to tolerate his employees forming a union.

In the third season of Deep Space Nine, Quark's nephew Nog becomes the first Ferengi to join Starfleet, the military and exploration arm of the United Federation of Planets. This development prompted discussions on electronic mailing lists devoted to Star Trek. Various commentators suggested that, given how Nog had behaved in previous episodes, it was surprising that Starfleet would take him on. They suggested that this might indicate that Starfleet had some form of affirmative action policy to benefit species not presently represented in Starfleet. Other online commentators argued that this viewpoint was racist, and that Nog would have been accepted as a Starfleet cadet because he was qualified, not because of his racial identity.

Attributes

Culture
Ferengi culture is depicted, especially on Deep Space Nine, as focused on the acquisition of profit as the highest goal. Many episodes portray this as taken to a comical extreme, as, for example, Ferengi prayer involves paying bribes to the gods, and Ferengi funeral rites involve auctioning off the deceased's remains. Ferengi characters frequently quote the "Rules of Acquisition", a collection of proverbs that are said to govern Ferengi business practices (such as "Never place friendship above profit"); a compilation of these Rules was published by Deep Space Nine showrunner Ira Steven Behr.

Ferengi culture is also portrayed as extremely sexist; in early seasons of Deep Space Nine, Ferengi females are not permitted to earn profit, travel, or even wear clothing. A long-running plot thread on DS9 features Ferengi society's gradual evolution away from these practices, especially as Quark's mother Ishka establishes herself as a respected businesswoman and financial advisor.

Biology and appearance

The Ferengi were first designed by Andrew Probert and later refined and produced by Michael Westmore.

The most prominent feature in Ferengi design is their large ear lobes.  Ferengi experience sexual stimulation when their lobes are rubbed — an act called "oo-mox". Ferengi females allegedly have smaller lobes, but the only female Ferengi characters shown in the series were Pel and Ishka. Betazoids are incapable of reading Ferengi emotions.  The focus on ears extends to figures of speech (i.e. "not having the lobes" to indicate a lack of courage) and to health problems (i.e. an ear infection proving fatal).

Homeworld 
The Ferengi home planet, Ferenginar, is introduced in the Star Trek: Deep Space Nine episode "Family Business". Ferenginar experiences near-constant torrential rain; consequently, the Ferengi language has 178 different words for rain (and none for "crisp").

Spacecraft 
A Ferengi shuttlecraft was introduced in the episode "The Price". It was also seen in "Little Green Men" as a spacecraft used by Quark. The studio model for VFX was auctioned by Christie's for over US$8,000 in 2006.

There is a larger Ferengi spaceship called the Marauder. The Marauder was designed by Andrew Probert, and the model was built by Greg Jein; the studio model was constructed of resin, fiberglass, and aluminum.

Reception 
In 2017, SYFY rated the Ferengi one of the top 11 most bizarre aliens of Star Trek: The Next Generation.

In 2017, Den of Geek ranked the Ferengi the 8th best aliens of the Star Trek franchise, in between Andorians and Romulans.

Examples of well-received Ferengi-focused episodes in Star Trek: Deep Space Nine include "Little Green Men", in which Ferengi characters travel back in time to the 1940s and become the alien invaders in the Roswell UFO incident, and "The Magnificent Ferengi", in which a group of Ferengi characters team up to rescue Quark's mother when she is captured by an enemy empire.

Comparisons with anti-Semitic stereotypes

Various critics have argued that the depiction of the Ferengi and their culture mirrors anti-Semitic stereotypes of Jews, namely the love of profit and the oversized facial features – in the case of the Ferengi, the ears. During the 1990s, this issue was discussed on electronic mailing lists devoted to the franchise, with some commentators arguing that there were parallels and others objecting to the comparison. In his 2007 critique of The Next Generation for the National Review, the commentator Jonah Goldberg described the Ferengi as "runaway capitalists with bullwhips who looked like a mix between Nazi caricatures of Jews and the original Nosferatu."
The scholar of religion Ross S. Kraemer wrote that "Ferengi religion seems almost a parody, perhaps of traditional Judaism." He wrote that the 285 Rules of Acquisition bore similarities with the 613 Commandments of Judaism and that the Ferengi social restrictions on women mirrored Orthodox Judaism's restrictions on women studying the Torah. Historian Paul Sturtevant wrote in 2018 that not only are the Ferengi "extremely legalistic" and "defined by their greed", echoing common stereotypes of Jews, but the major Ferengi characters on Deep Space Nine were all played by Jewish actors.

Shimerman addressed the issue when asked at a question-and-answer session at a Star Trek convention. He stated that:

Robert Hewitt Wolfe, writer for Deep Space Nine, has stated that the creative team (several of whom were Jewish) were aware at the time that many already saw the Ferengi as Jewish stereotypes, but that they attempted to mitigate this, both through characterization of Ferengi characters as individuals, and through incorporating aspects of multiple human cultures into Ferengi culture.

References

Footnotes

Bibliography

Further reading
 Ira Steven Behr and Robert Hewitt Wolfe, Legends of the Ferengi (1997), . The authors worked on Star Trek: Deep Space Nine for several years and established most of what is known about the Ferengi.
 Daniel L. Bernardi, Star Trek and History: Race-ing Toward a White Future. New Brunswick and London: Rutgers University Press, 1998

External links
 Official StarTrek.com Library article on Ferengi

 
Fictional humanoids
Star Trek species
Fictional elements introduced in 1987